On December 8, 1995, eight people, including the assailant, were killed when a gunman seized hostages at Freddy's Fashion Mart in Harlem, New York City and set the building on fire.

Background
In 1995 a black Pentecostal Church, the United House of Prayer, which owned a retail property on 125th Street across from the Apollo Theatre, asked Fred Harari, a Jewish tenant who operated Freddie's  Fashion Mart, to evict his longtime subtenant, a record store called The Record Shack owned by black South African Sikhulu Shange. African-American activist Al Sharpton led protests outside the Harlem store over several weeks against both the planned eviction of The Record Shack, and because Freddie's did not employ any black workers. Sharpton told the crowd of protesters: "We will not stand by and allow them to move this brother so that some white interloper can expand his business."

Attack
On December 8, 1995, Roland James Smith Jr., who may have attended previous protests outside the store, entered Harari's with a .38-caliber revolver and a container of flammable liquid. He ordered customers to leave, then set the store on fire by sprinkling around the accelerant - positioning himself near the only exit. Smith shot at two police officers arriving at the scene, and shot four customers as they were escaping the fire. It was two hours before firefighters could enter the burned-out building to discover seven store employees had died of smoke inhalation, and the gunman had fatally shot himself. Fire Department officials discovered that the store's sprinkler had been shut down, in violation of the local fire code. The only fire escape had been bricked up (this was not a violation at the time, as long as a working sprinkler system was provided), so the only exit for those trapped meant passing the gunman. Three of the victims were found in a back room at street level, and four in the sealed basement.

Aftermath
Sharpton subsequently said the perpetrator was an open critic of himself and his nonviolent tactics. In 2002, Sharpton expressed regret for making the racial remark "white interloper" but denied responsibility for inflaming or provoking the violence.

References

1995 in New York City
1990s in Manhattan
1990s crimes in New York City
20th-century mass murder in the United States
Antisemitism in New York (state)
Crimes in Manhattan
Hostage taking in the United States
Arson in New York City
Attacks in the United States in 1995
1995 murders in the United States
Mass murder in New York (state)
Mass murder in New York City
Mass murder in the United States
Murder–suicides in New York City
1995 mass shootings in the United States
Mass murder in 1995
Massacres in the United States
Antisemitic attacks and incidents in the United States
Hate crimes
History of racism in New York (state)
Racially motivated violence in the United States
Harlem
Mass shootings in the United States
Fires in New York City